Cricket Superstar is an Australian cricket-based reality television series that airs on Fox8.  Working on a weekly elimination format (known on the show as dismissals), the winner will receive a rookie-contract with his state and a scholarship to the Centre of Excellence.  The winner was 21-year-old Victorian, Ian Holland.

Season One (2012)
The first series is hosted by Lee Furlong. Former Australian captain Allan Border is the chief judge and Graham Manou is the mentor.  It was filmed in Brisbane and featured guest appearances by current and former players including Matthew Hayden and Ricky Ponting.

It first aired on 4 January 2012.

Contestants
The final squad of 15 players was selected from 60 finalists, from over 1000 applicants.  The prize for the winner is a rookie contract with their state association for the 2012/13 season and a four-month scholarship at the Cricket Centre of Excellence in Brisbane.

References

External links
 Official Website

2012 Australian television series debuts
Fox8 original programming
Television shows set in Brisbane
English-language television shows
Australian sports television series
2010s Australian reality television series